is a Japanese anime series directed by Manabu Ono and co-produced by Gonzo and Nihon Ad Systems (NAS). Twenty five episodes of the series were broadcast in Japan on the television network TV Tokyo between October 3, 2007, and March 26, 2008. An additional OVA episode was produced for the DVD release in 2009. Funimation Entertainment acquired the license to distribute the anime series in North America in 2009 and has subsequently released several DVD collections and also streams the series online.

On November 2, 2007, a manga adaptation published by Shueisha started serialization in the Japanese shōnen manga magazine Jump Square. It ended serialization in April 2008, publishing a total of six chapters. A bound volume containing all the chapters was released on May 2, 2008.

Plot summary

Twenty years prior to the story's beginning, an asteroid headed for Earth destroys Pluto. Due to Pluto's destruction, the asteroid, which is dubbed Thanatos, becomes temporarily stagnant in Pluto's orbit. Now, in order to avoid Earth's impending destruction, the International Solarsystem Development Agency (ISDA) works on the "D-Project", and secretly creates weapons called "Dragons" after finding a dragon egg under the ocean. However, they soon find out that the asteroid is not their only threat, as powerful, destructive dragons from Thanatos appear on Earth.

After witnessing what looks like a murder by a strange creature, Jin Kamishina, a lonely 18-year-old boy who lost his family in a shuttle accident two years ago, gets involved with the ISDA and their efforts to battle the dragons from Thanatos. Helping him is Toa, a mysterious girl who saves him from falling to his death after the creature attacks him. As they delve deeper into the mysteries of the dragons, they encounter new friends and enemies, and also develop a closer relationship.

Terminology

The asteroid that destroyed Pluto twenty years prior to the series' beginning. Due to Pluto's destruction, the asteroid becomes stagnant within the former planet's orbit; however, some believe that the asteroid's current state is only temporary. If it does break free from Pluto's orbit Earth would be in grave danger since it is located in Thanatos' expected trajectory.
Thanatos also seems to contain extraterrestrial lifeforms. The ISDA calls these lifeforms "Dragons" and keeps their existence a secret from the public.
Thanatos's true nature is initially unknown. The original dragons were apparently able to communicate with it, even calling it "Mother", and at one point symbols on its surface appear to glow; each symbol then gradually disappears as if counting down. Once all the symbols disappear, the core becomes brightly illuminated.
Gio later states that he is Thanatos's successor after having visited it in hopes of saving Toa.
Near the end of the anime, Thanatos reveals itself to be a huge dragon, which is capable of releasing billions of dragon spawns resembling Ostrum, the fourth original dragon. It also possesses a soul, which is made up of countless beings' "spirits" or consciousness. It had ordered the three original dragons to check up on the Earth-made dragons, and had wanted them to return without making Resonances, but after their failure, it sends Ostrum to destroy the eggs instead. After seeing humanity's nature, it deemed them foolish, and wanted to destroy it, but after showing interest in Jin and Toa's love for each other, it instead wants to fuse with all of humanity at the expense of human life.
In the final episode, Thanatos's true nature is revealed: its main core is a silver sphere containing a female humanoid, whom Toa calls "mother". She realizes her faults, admitting that she has been alone for too long to understand what true love is, and decides to move on to the next planet as she contemplates its true meaning, though she expects to return to Earth.
In Greek mythology, Thanatos was a personification of Death and Mortality.
International Solarsystem Development Agency (ISDA)
The ISDA is a joint space exploration agency, which is basically an integration of every space agency on Earth. New Ogasawara is designated as its primary base, but it has successfully built bases and other structures around the world, including a base on the lunar surface.
ISDA029 Flight Accident
The ISDA029 shuttle flight from two years ago, which Jin and his family were involved in. After the shuttle exited the Ogasawara Space Port, it blew up and fell towards the ocean. The only survivor was Jin, who suspiciously had no major injuries despite falling from a high altitude. The ISDA investigated the incident and determined that it was due to pilot error, blaming Jin's father, who was the shuttle pilot. In truth, the true cause of the accident was the dragons from Thanatos; when they entered Earth's atmosphere they crossed paths with the shuttle, accidentally destroying it.

Located in the Ogasawara archipelago and consists of three islands: land island, space island, and sea island. It surfaced several dozen years ago, and is the ISDA's base of operations. The Ogasawara waters are also where the dragon egg was found.
Though it is located in Japanese territory, it is run by extraterritoriality law, with the ISDA as its main management.

A private nation headed by Prince Asim. Despite being a small country, the development of space exploration technology increased the country's financial base. The development of Martian facilities is one of their top priorities as Asim already resides in a palace built on the planet.
In their cooperation with the ISDA, the Gillard military is tasked with handling counter-terrorism. Though they appear to be cooperative with the ISDA, they are actually after the secret behind the Resonance process. After the one-year ellipsis, they have apparently taken charge of the ISDA.
One of their most significant forces are mass-produced, lobotomized dragons called Agathion, which are remotely controlled because the Gillard military lacks the knowledge of resonance.

A secret facility built by the ISDA for the discarding of obsolete dragons and their remains. An electromagnetic shielding surrounds the facility in order to prevent dragons from actualizing and escaping.

A Dragonaut is a dragon's partner, who is otherwise known as a "pilot" or "master". To successfully become a Dragonaut, one has to successfully resonate with a dragon egg. The name comes from the fusion of astronaut and dragon.
Communicator
A Communicator is a dragon's humanoid form. It is later implied in the series that in order for a dragon to take Communicator form, it has to complete a Resonance with a human.
Actualize
Actualizing is when a Communicator transforms into its dragon form.

The process that is used to determine a person's compatibility with a dragon. The ISDA's conceived process involves an artificially-made dragon egg extracting DNA from its expected human counterpart. How an original dragon from Thanatos succeeds in obtaining a Resonance with a human is unknown, but it appears as though they can achieve it without the human's consent, and the human may not even be aware that they have completed a Resonance with a dragon.
It is said that without a successful Resonance with a dragon, one will not be capable of controlling a dragon. Also, as mentioned by Akira and Machina, when a dragon makes a Resonance with a human, it is only then that a dragon can truly understand what having a soul means.
Resonance Connect
The connection between a dragon and its master. An artificially-made dragon normally acts on its master's thoughts and feelings; if the master does not have a steady form of communication with the dragon, it would most likely go berserk. However, original dragons are not subject to this restriction, and can act on their own free will despite completing a Resonance with a human.
Stigmata
A sign that shows up on the back of a dragon when they are about to die.

Led by Raina Cromwell, the Lindworm unit is composed of Dragonauts and their corresponding dragons, whose main purpose is to destroy Thanatos when the time comes. They are also tasked with fighting off enemy dragons that come from the asteroid.
In European mythology, 'Lindworm' is a large serpent-like dragon.

Another ISDA unit tasked with destroying Thanatos. Itsuki Habaragi is the unit leader. They are stationed in the L-3 space station orbiting Earth.
When the fourth original dragon from Thanatos appears, the Vritra Unit, except for Itsuki and Otohime, is annihilated during the confrontation.
In early Vedic religion, 'Vritra' was an Asura with the aspect of a serpent or dragon.

Production

Development
The original concept of Dragonaut: The Resonance was developed by Nihon Ad Systems (NAS). NAS and Gonzo studios, which produced anime series such as Last Exile and Brave Story, co-produced the series, along with a subsidiary of Konami, Konami Digital Entertainment.

On March 24, 2007, at the International Anime Fair in Tokyo, the first promotional image for the anime series was revealed. In addition, series' director Manabu Ono, and two of the series' voice actors, Daisuke Ono and Minori Chihara, attended the fair in order to promote the series. At the time, the complete cast for the anime was not yet assembled as the anime was still in the development stage. In fact, Manabu Ono expected that the series would continue being developed on, even after it begins broadcast in fall 2007.

While a majority of series designs are done in 2D animation, the mechanics of the dragons and their corresponding battles are done in 3D computer graphics. However, the dragon battles are the only confrontations done in CG, as character fights are in 2D since the director believes that highspeed character movements are best expressed in that form.

Broadcast
The anime series premiered on the Japanese terrestrial television network TV Tokyo on October 3, 2007. It ended its run on March 26, 2008, airing a total of twenty-five episodes. Although TV Tokyo aired the episodes first, other networks in Japan also broadcast the series, including TV Osaka, TV Aichi, TV Hokkaido, TV Setouchi, AT-X, and TVQ Kyushu Broadcasting Co. TV Osaka aired each episode a week after TV Tokyo, while the other networks aired them one or two days after TV Osaka.

Media

Anime

Dragonaut: The Resonance was broadcast on TV Tokyo between October 3, 2007, and March 26, 2008. The series is directed by Manabu Ono and co-produced by Gonzo and Nihon Ad Systems (NAS). The anime contains 25 episodes; not including "Episode 00", which is an interview with the director Manabu Ono. An additional OVA series episode was produced after the series broadcast for inclusion in the DVD release.

Konami Digital Entertainment released the first DVD in Japan on January 23, 2008, and the second volume was released nearly a month later on February 20. Seven more volumes are scheduled for consecutive monthly releases, the last of which will be the ninth volume on September 9. The first three volumes will contain different autographs from cast members. All DVDs will contain extras, which each includes a video of Makoto Uno drawing original illustrations of the series. DVD distribution will be handled by Sony.

North American DVD releases
Funimation Entertainment acquired the license to distribute the anime series in North America in 2009. Funimation produced English adaptations for all episodes and has released several DVD collections, beginning in 2009. All DVD release sets contain both Japanese and English dialog versions with a selectable subtitle option.

Dragonaut - The Resonance
  Part 01 (DVD), episodes 1-13, release date: 2009-11-03
  Part 02 (DVD), episodes 14-25 and OVA episode 26, release date: 2009-12-29
  Complete Series (DVD), episodes 1-25 and OVA episode 26, release date: 2010-12-28
  Complete Series [S.A.V.E.] (DVD), episodes 1-25 and OVA episode 26, release date: 2012-06-19

Reception
Both of the first two DVD collections released in North America by Funimation have been reviewed.  The reviews have generally run from average to above average.

 The first DVD collection included episodes 1 through 13. This DVD collection was reviewed by Chris Beveridge for the popular media blog Mania.com and given an overall grade of "C+". Theron Martin reviewed this collection for the Anime News Network and awarded grades from "D+" (story) to "B+" (music).
 The second DVD collection included episodes 14 through 25 plus the OVA episode 26. This DVD collection was reviewed by Chris Beveridge and given an overall grade of "C". Theron Martin also reviewed this collection and awarded grades from "B−" (story) to "B+" (music).

Streaming
Funimation offers the entire 26-episode series from their streaming site for North America, both subtitled Japanese and English dubbed versions.

Manga

On November 2, 2007, Shueisha began publishing a manga adaptation of the series, which is serialized in the Japanese shōnen manga magazine Jump Square. A total of six chapters was published; the last of which was in April 2008. Shueisha released a bound volume containing all the chapters on May 2, 2008.

Though the story remains to revolve around the lives of Jin Kamishina and Toa, the severity of the Dragon threat is increased in the manga, as Earth has been publicly invaded by these "type D" alien life-forms. The situations and personalities of most of the characters, especially those of the two protagonists, are also different compared to their anime counterparts.

Music
There are three pieces of theme music used in the anime series: one opening theme and two closing themes. The opening theme, "perfect blue", is performed, composed, and written by the J-pop group Jazzin' Park. ATSUMI also performed the piece alongside Jazzin' Park, as a guest vocal. The two ending themes are "Rain Of Love", which is performed by Yukari Fukui and composed by Hiroshi Takaki, with the lyrics written by Shoko Fujibayashi, and "FIGHT OR FLIGHT", which is performed by Yū Kobayashi.

On November 21, 2007, Jazzin' Park and Yukari Fukui each released a four track single. The titles of the theme songs are used as the titles for its corresponding single, which each contains an instrumental version of its theme song, along with at least one different song sung by the artist. Yū Kobayashi's second single, "FIGHT OR FLIGHT", also contained four tracks, and was released on January 23, 2008. Yukari Fukui's "Rain Of Love" is also the second single she has released, while Jazzin' Park's "perfect blue" is the first single they have ever released.

Internet radio
An internet radio broadcast began airing every Wednesday since September 5, 2007. The Dragonaut Station ISDA Information Agency centers around three voice actors from the anime answering e-mail questions about the series. The three female voice actors are Yukari Fukui, Yū Kobayashi, and Chise Nakamura, who voices Saki Kurata, Ryōko Kakei, and Megumi Jinguuji, respectively. Junichi Suwabe, Takuma Takewaka, Daisuke Ono, Eiji Maruyama, who voices Gio, Raina Cromwell, Jin Kamishina, and Amadeus, respectively, were guests during separate sessions.

The broadcast is hosted by Onsen, an internet radio station.

References

External links
 Dragonaut -The Resonance- Official Site  
 Funimation's Dragonaut Site
 

Anime with original screenplays
Dragons in popular culture
Funimation
Gonzo (company)
Science fiction anime and manga
Shōnen manga
Shueisha manga
TV Tokyo original programming